Fritz Höhn (1896-1918) was a German First World War fighter ace credited with 21 confirmed aerial victories. As one of the few pilots courageous enough to be a balloon buster, he destroyed ten of the crucial artillery direction posts, as well as we11 as 11 enemy airplanes. He scored his victories flying for four different fighter squadrons, the last three of which he commanded.

The victory list
 
Fritz Höhn's victories are reported in chronological order, which is not necessarily the order or dates the victories were confirmed by headquarters.
Abbreviations were expanded by the editor creating this list.

Footnote

Citations

Sources  

 
 

Aerial victories of Höhn, Fritz
Höhn, Fritz